Events from the year 1811 in Scotland.

Incumbents

Law officers 
 Lord Advocate – Archibald Colquhoun
 Solicitor General for Scotland – David Boyle; then David Monypenny

Judiciary 
 Lord President of the Court of Session – Lord Avontoun until 20 May; then Lord Granton
 Lord Justice General – The Duke of Montrose
 Lord Justice Clerk – Lord Granton, then Lord Boyle

Events 
 9 January – the first women's golf tournament in Scotland takes place at the links of the Musselburgh Golf Club.
 1 February – Bell Rock Lighthouse begins operation.
 March – Prisoner-of-war camp established at Penicuik.
 27 May – second national Census. In Scotland the count is carried out by schoolmasters.
 June – Walter Scott buys the farm at Abbotsford near Galashiels and commences building his future residence, Abbotsford House.
 August – passengers are being carried on the Kilmarnock and Troon Railway, in horse-drawn vehicles.
 November – Thomas Telford's bridge at Bridge of Alford is completed.
 31 December – Tron riot breaks out in Edinburgh.
 Highland Clearances – the Marquess and Marchioness of Stafford begin mass expulsion of crofting tenants from their Highland estates to make way for sheep farming.
 Glasgow, Paisley and Johnstone Canal completed throughout.
 Helmsdale and Torgoyle Bridges completed to the design of Thomas Telford.
 Inner harbour at Wick completed to the design of Thomas Telford.
 Harbour at Kirkwall (Orkney) first built.
 Harbour at Dunure built at the expense of Archibald Kennedy, 12th Earl of Cassilis. Dunrobin pier is also built about this date.
 Remodelling of the House of the Binns in Scottish Baronial style by William Burn for the Dalyell family.
 Rebuilding of Stobo Castle completed.
 The Edinburgh Society for the Support of Gaelic Schools is established.
 Edinburgh Astronomical Institution established.
 Sinking of a new colliery on the Brora Coalfield is begun.
 Approximate date – John Paton begins his own yarn spinning business in Alloa.

Births 
 January – Robert Dick, natural historian (died 1866)
 c. May – Thomas Larkins Walker, architect practicing in England (died 1860 in Hong Kong)
 7 June – James Simpson, obstetrician and pioneer of anaesthesia (died 1870)
 13 July – James "paraffin" Young, chemist (died 1883)
 14 August – Adam Clark, civil engineer (died 1866 in Budapest)
 12 September – William Bell Scott, artist and poet (died 1890)
 19 December – Marjorie Fleming, child writer (born 1803)
 21 December – Archibald Tait, Archbishop of Canterbury (died 1882)
 Christian Maclagan, antiquary (died 1901)

Deaths 
 20 May – Robert Blair, Lord Avontoun, lawyer (born 1741)
 28 May – Henry Dundas, 1st Viscount Melville, politician (born 1742)
 14 September – James Grahame, poet, lawyer and clergyman (born 1765)
 15 October – George Hay, Roman Catholic bishop (born 1729)
 27 November – Andrew Meikle, mechanical engineer and inventor (born 1719)

See also 
 1811 in the United Kingdom

References 

 
Scotland
Years of the 19th century in Scotland
1810s in Scotland